Kyle Garland (born 28 May 2000) is an American decathlete.

At the USA World Championship Trials in June 2022, Garland finished second in the decathlon with a Collegiate Record score. This score included sixth personal bests, and placed him top 10 all time American, and top 20 all time worldwide with Garland the youngest of whom to have scored such a total. Garland was selected to compete at the 2022 World Athletics Championships held in Eugene, Oregon. Garland scored top 10 after the shot put, long jump and 100 metres events before ultimately finishing eleventh on his major championship debut.

Career

NCAA
Kyle Garland is a 1-time NCAA Division 1 champion, 5-time NCAA Division 1 All-American & 4-time Southeastern Conference Champion in the multi-events.

Prep
Garland was brought up in Northeast, Philadelphia before enrolling as a student at the University of Georgia.

Garland won gold at the 2018 USATF U20 Championships in the Decathlon scoring 7562 points.

As a Germantown Academy senior, Garland won the 2018 PAISAA state championships in the 
Long Jump 23' 2" (1st place)
Javelin 175' 6" (1st place)
300 meter hurdles 38.74 s (1st place)
110 meter hurdles 13.97 (1st place)

References

External links

2000 births
Living people
American decathletes
World Athletics Championships athletes for the United States
21st-century American people